Gressholman or Grasholmen is an island in Harstad Municipality in Troms og Finnmark county, Norway. It is part of a small archipelago of several islets just outside the town of Harstad along the Vågsfjorden, at the northern end of the Tjeldsundet strait. The village of Fauskevåg lies on the large island of Hinnøya, just west of Grasholmen. The islets are popular recreational areas, especially in the summer.

References

Harstad
Islands of Troms og Finnmark